Recouvrance may refer to:
 Recouvrance, Territoire de Belfort, a village and commune in Territoire de Belfort, France
 Recouvrance, Brest, a district in Brest, France
 La Recouvrance (schooner)

See also
 Pont de Recouvrance, a bridge in Recouvrance, Brest
 Banogne-Recouvrance, a commune in the Ardennes